John O'Neill may refer to:

Music 
John O'Neill (guitarist) (born 1957), Northern Irish guitarist of rock band The Undertones
John O'Neill (musician, born 1926) (1926–1999), British singer, whistler, and trumpeter

Politics 
John O'Neill (Canadian politician) (1858–1922), Liberal politician in Ontario, Canada
John O'Neill (congressman) (1822–1905), U.S. Representative from Ohio
John O'Neill (Fenian) (1834–1878), member of the Irish Republican Brotherhood (Fenians)
John O'Neill (Irish senator) (died 1941), Irish  senator in 1925
John O'Neill (philosopher), political philosopher, professor of political economy at the University of Manchester 
John O'Neill (political activist) (born 1946), fervent opponent of John Kerry and a leader of the groups Swift Vets and POWs for Truth
John O'Neill (Wisconsin politician) (1830–?), Wisconsin state assemblyman
John O'Neill, 1st Viscount O'Neill (1740–1798), Irish politician
John O'Neill, 3rd Viscount O'Neill (1780–1855), Irish Tory politician
John A. O'Neill (died 1892), American steel engraver and mayor of Hoboken, New Jersey
John Joseph O'Neill (American politician) (1846–1898), Missouri Congressman
John Joseph O'Neill (British politician) (1888–1953), Liberal Party politician in England, Member of Parliament for Lancaster 1923–1924
John Raymond O'Neill (1891–1951), Conservative member of the Canadian House of Commons
St John O'Neill (1741–1790) represented Randalstown in the Irish House of Commons

Sports 
John O'Neill (Australian rules footballer) (born 1935), Geelong player during the 1950s
John O'Neill (baseball), baseball player
John O'Neill (field hockey) (born 1968), American former field hockey player
John O'Neill (footballer, born 1935) (1935–2012), Republic of Ireland and Preston North End player
John O'Neill (footballer, born 1958), Northern Ireland player
John O'Neill (footballer, born 1974), former Scottish football player with Queen of the South and former manager of Stirling Albion
John O'Neill (rugby league) (1943–1999), Australian rugby league footballer and coach
John O'Neill (rugby union), Irish rugby union player
John O'Neill (Tipperary hurler) (born 1990), Irish hurler

Other 
John O'Neill, architect who oversaw the completion of St Peter's Cathedral, Belfast
John O'Neill (businessman) (born 1951), CEO of the Australian Rugby Union and former head of Football Federation Australia
John O'Neill (editor), founding editor of Black Gate (magazine)
John O'Neill (lighthouse keeper) (1768–1838), American military officer and lighthouse keeper
John O'Neill (poet) (1777–1854), Irish shoemaker poet and playwright
John O'Neill (VC) (1897–1942), Scottish recipient of the Victoria Cross during the First World War
John O'Neill (video game designer) (born 1948), experimental art video game designer
John O'Neill, 3rd Earl of Tyrone (died 1641), the son of Hugh O'Neill
John Johnston O'Neill (1886–1966), Canadian geologist and academic
John Joseph O'Neill (journalist) (1889–1953), winner of the Pulitzer Prize for Reporting
John P. O'Neill (1952–2001), former FBI agent and head of security at the World Trade Center at the time of the September 11, 2001 attacks
John S. O'Neill (born 1979), British molecular biologist
John Michael O'Neill, Canadian Roman Catholic bishop
John O'Neill (sociologist), Canadian sociologist, phenomenologist, and social theorist

See also
John O'Neal (disambiguation)
John O'Neil (disambiguation)
Jack O'Neill (disambiguation)